The Half-Finished Heaven is a 1962 poetry collection by the Swedish writer Tomas Tranströmer.

1962 poetry books
Poetry by Tomas Tranströmer
Swedish poetry collections